There are at least 30 named lakes and reservoirs in Teton County, Montana.

Lakes
 Basin Lake, el. 
 Davis Lake, el. 
 Eyraud Lakes, el. 
 Freezeout Lake, el. 
 Glendora Lake, el. 
 Lake Theboe, el. 
 Middle Lake, el. 
 Our Lake, el. 
 Pond Number Five, el. 
 Pond Number Four, el. 
 Pond Number One, el. 
 Pond Number Six, el. 
 Pond Number Three, el. 
 Pond Number Two, el. 
 Priest Butte Lake, el. 
 Reickoff Lakes, el. 
 Round Lake, el. 
 Split Rock Lake, el. 
 Tunnel Lake, el. 
 Twin Lakes, el.

Reservoirs

 Burd Hill Lake, el. 
 Bynum Reservoir, el. 
 Dougcliff Reservoir, el. 
 Eureka Reservoir, el. 
 Farmers Reservoir, el. 
 Gibson Reservoir, el. 
 Harvey Lake, el. 
 John Lane Reservoir, el. 
 Pishkun Reservoir, el. 
 Theboe Lake, el.

See also
 List of lakes in Montana

Notes

Bodies of water of Teton County, Montana
Teton